The 43rd edition of the annual Hypo-Meeting took place on May 27 and May 28, 2017 in Götzis, Austria. The track and field competition, featuring a men's decathlon and a women's heptathlon event was part of the 2017 IAAF Combined Events Challenge. Damian Warner (8591 points) and Nafissatou Thiam (7013 points) were the winners of the events overall. Thiam's score was the third best time in history and she became only the fourth woman to ever score over 7000 points.

Men's Decathlon

Schedule 

May 27

May 28

Records

Results

Women's heptathlon

Schedule 

May 27

May 28

Records

Results

References 

 Results
 Women's Event by Event Heptathlon Scores
 Men's Event by Event Decathlon Scores

2017
Hypo-Meeting
Hypo-Meeting
May 2017 events in Europe